Pop Goes the World is the third studio album by Canadian new wave and synth-pop band Men Without Hats, released on June 29, 1987 by Mercury Records. It features the single "Pop Goes the World", which reached the Top 20 in Canada (achieving gold status) and the United States. The album went platinum in Canada.

Ian Anderson of Jethro Tull makes a guest appearance and plays the flute on the track "On Tuesday."

Other songs
Early in the recording sessions, a song called "The Same Halo" was recorded by the band for the album but was ultimately replaced by "Lose My Way" on the album.

"Jenny Wore Black" was first performed live in 1985 during the "Freeways" tour.

In 1990, Doroschuk wrote the song "A Funny Place (The World Is)", which reused part of the lyrics from "The Real World". It was recorded with Mitsou on her second studio album Terre des hommes (1990); Doroschuk sang backing vocals, played various instruments and produced the recording.

A French-language demo called "Pyjamarama" was recorded the following year.

Singles
Along with the title track, two other singles from this album were released, but neither got much notice. These singles were "Moonbeam", which featured a complementing music video, and "O Sole Mio" that was backed by "Lose My Way" as a promo single.

Track listing
All tracks written by Ivan Doroschuk.

Side one
 "Intro" – 1:49
 "Pop Goes the World" – 3:43
 "On Tuesday" – 4:08
 "Bright Side of the Sun" – 0:42
 "O Sole Mio" – 3:57
 "Lose My Way" – 3:10
 "The Real World" – 4:24

Side two
"Moonbeam" – 3:37
 "In the Name of Angels" – 3:49
 "La Valse d'Eugénie" – 1:28
 "Jenny Wore Black" – 2:57
 "Intro/Walk on Water" – 5:43
 "The End (Of the World)" – 3:23

Personnel
Men Without Hats
 Ivan Doroschuk — vocals, guitar, keyboards, drum programming
 Stefan Doroschuk — vocals, guitar, bass, keyboards
 Lenny Pinkas — keyboards

Special Guest
 Ian Anderson — flute on "On Tuesday"

The album artwork, however, lists the following:

 Ivan — vocals
 Johnny — guitar
 Jenny — bass
 J. Bonhomme — drums
 and a little baby on keyboards

Johnny, Jenny, J. Bonhomme and the baby were actually characters from the opening song "Pop Goes the World"—the album graphics were designed to reference their roles in the song, which opens with the line "Johnny played gee-tar, Jenny played bass."  The album follows a loose conceptual thread, and Johnny and Jenny go on to appear as characters in numerous other songs on the disc, being mentioned by name in "In the Name of Angels" "Jenny Wore Black" and "The End (Of The World)".  The role of "Johnny" on the album cover (and in videos) was played by Stefan Doroschuk, the band's actual guitarist. The actress who played Jenny is unknown, although she is often believed to be Louise Court.
Bonhomme is also referenced in the song "Pop Goes The World" (as "a big bonhomme").  A  is a snowman; a character known as "Bonhomme Carnaval" (a man in a stylized snowman costume with a stocking cap or a top hat) is a common mascot at Quebec winter carnivals.  The album cover shows the character Bonhomme as the band's drummer.  The initial J. would seem to be a multi-lingual pun, referencing both the French phrase "Joyeux bonhomme", as well as the English rock drummer John Bonham.

The only credited musician aside from the Doroschuks and Pinkas is Ian Anderson of the rock group Jethro Tull.  Anderson plays flute on track 3, "On Tuesday".

The Pop Goes the World touring band between 1987 and 1988 consisted of:

 Ivan Doroschuk — vocals, guitar, keyboards
 Stefan Doroschuk — guitar
 Marika Tjelios — bass
 Richard Samson — drums
 Lenny Pinkas, Heidi Garcia, Bruce Murphy — keyboards

Certifications

References

External links
 

Men Without Hats albums
1987 albums
Mercury Records albums